George Churchill may refer to:

 George Churchill (Royal Navy officer) (1654–1710), Royal Navy admiral, politician, Member of Parliament
 George Churchill (British Army officer) (died 1753), son of the above
 George Percy Churchill (1877–1973), British historian and diplomat
 George B. Churchill (1866–1925), U.S. Representative from Massachusetts

See also 
George Spencer-Churchill (disambiguation)